Spathandra is a genus of plant in family Melastomataceae.

Species include:
 Spathandra barteri, Hook.f.

 
Melastomataceae genera
Taxonomy articles created by Polbot